Neopolyptychus spurrelli is a moth of the family Sphingidae. It is found from Ghana to Sierra Leone.

The wingspan is 32–39 mm for males and 36–40 mm for females.

References

Neopolyptychus
Moths of Africa
Moths described in 1912